Farah Kosh-e Olya (also Romanized as Faraḩ Kosh-e ‘Olyā and Faraḩ Kash-e ‘Olyā; also known as Faraḩ Kash, Faraḩkesh-e Bālā, Fārākash, and Seydān) is a village in Zagheh Rural District, Zagheh District, Khorramabad County, Lorestan Province, Iran. At the 2006 census, its population was 96, in 24 families.

References 

Towns and villages in Khorramabad County